Sweetwater Dam Naval Outlying Landing Field was a airfield near Naval Auxiliary Air Station Brown Field and Naval Air Station North Island used to support the training of US Navy pilots during World War 2. The runway built in 1944 was located in what is now a neighborhood 8 mile east of San Diego, California. The Navy support airfields are called Naval Outlying Landing Field (NOLF). For the war, many new trained pilots were needed. The Naval Outlying Landing Field provided a place for pilots to practice landing and take off without other air traffic. Sweetwater Dam site offered flight training without distractions. Most of the new pilots departed to the Pacific War after training. The Sweetwater Dam Outlying Landing Field had no support facilities. After the war the Outlying field closed in 1946, having completed the role of training new pilots. Sweetwater Dam Naval Outlying Landing Field and Sweetwater Carrier Landing Strip. The Landing Field had a single 3,000-foot east/west asphalt runway. The Navy leased 135.45 acres of grassland from Rancho de la Nación for the Landing Field. In 1949 the runway became a private civil airport, the Sweetwater Dam Airport also called the Paradise Mesa Airstrip.  The Airport is named after the nearby Sweetwater Dam that makes the Sweetwater Reservoir. The Airport closed in 1951 and the runway became home to the Paradise Mesa Drag strip. The Carlsbad, California's Oilers Club help start the drag strip with the first meet on March 11, 1951. At its peak, 25 clubs were using the strip. The drag strip closed in 1959. Houses were built on the site, now called Paradise Hills and no trace of the runway can be found today. Part of the site is also the Daniel Boone Elementary School.

See also

'*California during World War II
American Theater (1939–1945)
United States home front during World War II

References

1940s in California
Formerly Used Defense Sites in California
United States in World War II
1944 establishments in California